Cincinnati East Manufacturing and Warehouse District is a registered historic district in Cincinnati, Ohio, listed in the National Register on March 12, 1999. It contains 23 contributing buildings.  It is roughly bounded E. Court Street, E. 8th Street, Broadway, and Main Street in the central business district.

The late 19th and early 20th century, buildings in the historic district are mostly five to seven stories tall and originally housed of industry and manufacturing operations.

In the late 20th century, several contributing buildings to this historic district were converted from industrial space into luxury apartments and condominiums.  The Power Building (1903) at 224 E. 8th Street was transformed into the Renaissance at the Power Building.

Notes 

Historic districts in Cincinnati
National Register of Historic Places in Hamilton County, Ohio
Historic districts on the National Register of Historic Places in Ohio
Chicago school architecture in Ohio